Alberta has experienced a relatively high rate of growth in recent years, due in large part to its economy. Between 2003 and 2004, the province saw high birthrates (on par with some larger provinces such as British Columbia), relatively high immigration, and a high rate of interprovincial migration when compared to other provinces. Approximately 81% of the population live in urban areas and only about 19% live in rural areas. The Calgary–Edmonton Corridor is the most urbanized area in Alberta and is one of Canada's four most urban regions. Many of Alberta's cities and towns have also experienced high rates of growth in recent history. From a population of 73,022 in 1901, Alberta has grown to 3,645,257 in 2011 and in the process has gone from less than 1.5% of Canada's population to 10.9%. As of July 1, 2018, Alberta's population represented 11.6% of Canada's total population of 37,058,856 making it the fourth most populated province in Canada. According to the 2018 third quarter report, Alberta's population increased by 23,096 to 4,330,206, the largest increase since the 2014 economic downturn.

Population history 

† 1901 population for District of Alberta, part of the then-named North-West Territories.

Population geography

Census divisions

Census metropolitan areas 
As of the 2011 census, Alberta had two census metropolitan areas (CMAs) recognized by Statistics Canada. A third one was added in the 2016 census.

The following is a list of the recent population history of the Calgary and Edmonton CMAs.

The third CMA added in 2016 is Lethbridge, and its population history is as follows:

The fourth CMA added in 2021 is Red Deer, and its population history is as follows:

CMA notes:

Census agglomerations

Census subdivisions 

As of the 2006 census, Alberta had 453 census subdivisions (municipalities and municipal equivalents) recognized by Statistics Canada. The following is a list of those census subdivisions with a population of 10,000 or greater.

Population centres

Designated places

Ethnic origins 
The ethnicities most commonly reported in the 2021 Census are shown in the table below. The percentages add up to more than 100% because of dual responses (e.g. "Irish-Canadian" generates an entry in both the category "Irish" and the category "Canadian").

Other ethnic groups
In addition to the groups listed above, the next most commonly reported (counting both single and multiple responses) were:
 73,355 First Nations n.o.s. (1.8%); 
 70,790 European n.o.s. (1.7%); 
 66,100 American (1.6%); 
 62,465 Cree (1.5%); 
 56,190 Danish (1.3%);
 51,360 Hungarian (1.2%); 
 40,165 Spanish (1.0%); 
 39,535 Pakistani (0.9%); 
 39,395 Vietnamese (0.9%);
 37,585 Punjabi (0.9%); 
 36,220 Austrian (0.9%);
 34,225 African n.o.s. (0.8%)
 32,365 French (0.8%); 
 31,565 Mennonite (0.8%); 
 31,530 Korean (0.8%);
 31,255 Asian n.o.s. (0.7%); 
 28,860 Sikhs (0.7%); 
 28,480 Lebanese (0.7%); 
 26,600 Albertan (0.6%);
 26,435 North American Indigenous n.o.s. (0.6%);
 25,800 Northern Europe n.o.s. (0.6%);
 25,450 Mexican (0.6%);
 24,170 Korean (0.6%);
 23,860 Arab n.o.s. (0.6%);
 22,450 Swiss (0.5%);
 21,985 Belgian (0.5%);
 21,415 Portuguese (0.5%)

Future projections

Visible minorities and Aboriginals

Languages

Knowledge of languages

The question on knowledge of languages allows for multiple responses. The following figures are from the 2021 Canadian Census and the 2016 Canadian Census, and lists languages that were selected by at least one per cent of respondents.

Mother tongue

Of the 3,978,145 singular responses to the 2016 census question concerning mother tongue, the languages most commonly reported were:

In addition to the table above, other mother tongues in Alberta include (including languages with more than 407 people, or 0.01 per cent of respondents):

 2,010 Telugu;
 1,655 Marathi;
 1,595 Hiligaynon;
 1,505 Bulgarian;
 1,470 Thai;
 1,470 Kurdish;
 1,350 Indo-Iranian languages, not included elsewhere;
 1,310 Malay;
 1,100 Serbo-Croatian;
 1,075 Lao;
 1,050 Hebrew;
 975 Pampangan;
 870 Sign languages;
 835 Finnish;
 780 Karenic languages;
 755 Mongolian;
 710 Tibetan;
 655 Lithuanian;
 640 Slovenian;
 495 Latvian;
 445 Armenian;
 430 Macedonian;

In addition to the single-language responses detailed above, about 88,765 people reported having more than one mother tongue. There were 74,515 responses of both English and a non-official language; 2,785 of both French and a non-official language; 10,005 of both English and French; and 1,455 of English, French and a non-official language.

Religion 

Just under 50 percent of Albertans identify as Christian, while over 40 percent of residents identify with no religion. The largest denominations are the Roman Catholic, United, Anglican, Lutheran, and Eastern Orthodox and Oriental Orthodox Churches.

Just over 1 percent of Albertans are members of the Church of Jesus Christ of Latter-day Saints, descended from pioneers who emigrated from Utah around the turn of the 20th century; there are three temples in the province. Alberta also has large numbers of Pentecostal, Presbyterians, and evangelical Christians.

There are significant numbers of Mennonites and Hutterites, which are communal Anabaptist sects. There are also many Jehovah's Witnesses and Reformed Christians, as well a significant population of Seventh-day Adventists in and around Lacombe where the Canadian University College is located.

Alberta is also home to several Eastern Rite Churches as part of the legacy of Eastern European immigrants, including the Ukrainian Catholic Eparchy of Edmonton, and the Ukrainian Orthodox Diocese of Edmonton and Western Canada. There are 500 Doukhobors living in their few communities across Southern Alberta.

Many people of the Hindu, Sikh, and Muslim faiths also make Alberta their home; one of the largest Sikh temples in Canada is located just outside Edmonton. Most of Alberta's Jewish population of 11,390 lives in Calgary and Edmonton.

 Statistics Canada. 2022. Alberta (table). National Household Survey (NHS) Profile. 2021 National Household Survey. Released October 26, 2022.

Migration

Immigration 

The 2021 census reported that immigrants (individuals born outside Canada) comprise 970,975 persons or 23.2 percent of the total population of Alberta.

Recent immigration
The 2021 Canadian census counted a total of 193,170 people who immigrated to Alberta between 2016 and 2021.

Interprovincial migration

Over the past five decades, Alberta has had the highest net increase from interprovincial migration of any province. However, it typically experiences population decline during economic downturns, as it did during the 1980s. Oil is the main industry driving interprovincial migration to Alberta, as many Canadians move to Alberta to work on the oil fields. Interprovincial migration to Alberta rises and drops dependent of the price of oil. There was a dramatic reduction after the 2014 drop in oil prices.

Source: Statistics Canada

See also 

Demographics of Calgary
Demographics of Canada
Demographics of Edmonton
Population of Canada by province and territory

Notes

References 

Alberta
Alberta society